The 2015 Kwun Tong District Council election was held on 22 November 2015 to elect all 37 members to the Kwun Tong District Council.

Overall election results
Before election:

Change in composition:

References

External links
 Election Results - Overall Results

2015 Hong Kong local elections